Gonzalo Aguirre Beltrán (January 20, 1908 in Tlacotalpan, Veracruz –1996 in Xalapa, Veracruz) was a Mexican anthropologist known for his studies of marginal populations. His work has focused on Afro-Mexican and indigenous  populations. He was the director of the National Indigenous Institute and as Assistant Secretary for Popular Culture and Continuing Education he was responsible for forming government policy towards indigenous populations.  For this reason he is important in the field of applied anthropology.

Life and career
Aguirre Beltrán was the son of a medical doctor in Veracruz state and he continued himself in medical studies, attending the National University and earning a B.S. in 1927 and his M.D. in 1931.  He returned to his home state, and practiced medicine in the town of Huatusco for ten years.

In his early years as a medical doctor, he became interested in local history and published a book on agrarian struggle during the colonial era. In 1942 he met Columbia University-trained anthropologist Manuel Gamio, who suggested that Aguirre Beltrán study blacks in Mexico, resulting in his landmark study, La población negra de México, 1519-1810: Estudio etnohistórico (1946). He left the practice of medicine in favor of becoming an anthropologist, although he pursued topics on medical anthropology.

He served in various government positions, including as head of the Sanitary Unit of Huatusco. He was appointed head of the Department of Demography in the Department of the Interior in the Manuel Avila Camacho and Miguel Alemán administrations.  He director of Indigenous Affairs in the Secretariat of Public Education (1946–49), a researcher for the National Indigenous Institute (INI) (1949–50), coordinator of INI's Tzeltal-Tzotzil region (1951–52), and subdirector of INI (1952–56).  He returned to Veracruz and became rector of the Universidad Veracruzana. Under the administration of Luis Echeverría (1970–76) he was sub-secretary of the Department of Culture and Continuing Education, creating a publication series disseminating research on indigenous communities.

Works 
 El señorío de Cuauhtocho: Luchas agrarias en México durante el virreinato 1940.
 La población negra de México, 1519-1810: Estudio etnohistórico. Mexico City  1946.
 Formas de gobierno indígena. Mexico City 1953.
 Problemas de salud en la situación intecultural 1953
 Problemas de la población indígena de la cuenca del Tepalcatepec 1953.
 Cuijila: Esbozo etnográfico de un pueblo 1957.
 Medicina y mágica: El proceso de aculturación Mexico City 1963.
 Regiones de refugio: El desarrollo de la comunidad y el proceso dominical en mestizoamérica. Mexico City 1967. (translated as Regions of Refuge), Society of Applied Anthropology 1979.
 Teoría y práctica de la educación indígena 1973
 Obra polémica 1976.
 Lenguas vernáculas: Su uso y deuso en la enseñanza, la experiencia de México 1983.
 Zongólica: Encuentro de dioses y santos patronos 1986.
 Crítica antropólica: Contribuciones al estudio del pensamiento de México 1990.
 Obra antropológica (16 vols) Mexico City 1989-1995. Mexico City, Fundo de Cultura Económica.

Honors
 Malinowski Award of the Society for Applied Anthropology 1973
 Manuel Gamio Award 1978
 National Social Science Prize 1979
 Belisario Domínguez Medal 1991

See also
 1973 Bronislaw Malinowski Award

References

Further reading
Camp, Roderic Ai. "Gonzalo Aguierre Beltrán" in Mexican Political Biographies 2nd edition. Tucson: University of Arizona Press 1982, pp. 5–6. 
 Instituto Indigenista Interamericano. Homenaje a Gonzalo Aguirre Beltrán. 3 vols. Mexico City 1973-74.
 Kemper, Robert V. "Gonzalo Aguirre Beltrán," in Oxford Encyclopedia of Mesoamerican Cultures, vol. 1, pp. 8–9. New York: Oxford University Press 2001.
 Peña, Guillermo de la. "Gonzalo Aguierre Beltrán," La antropología en México, panorama histórico. Lina Odena Güemes and Calors Garcia Mora, pp. 63–95. Mexico City 1988.
 Malinowski Chapter 3

Mexican anthropologists
1908 births
1996 deaths
Mexican Mesoamericanists
20th-century Mexican historians
Medical anthropologists
Recipients of the Belisario Domínguez Medal of Honor
20th-century anthropologists
People from Tlacotalpan
National Autonomous University of Mexico alumni